Potassium voltage-gated channel subfamily V member 1 is a protein that in humans is encoded by the KCNV1 gene. The protein encoded by this gene is a voltage-gated potassium channel subunit.

Common variations in the KCNV1 gene have been associated with schizophrenia.

References

Further reading

External links 
 
 

Ion channels